Last Man Standing is the 67th solo studio album by Willie Nelson. It was released on April 27, 2018, by Legacy Recordings.

Critical reception

The album was widely praised by music critics, and it received a Metacritic rating of 84 based on 11 critics, indicating "universal acclaim".

Commercial performance
The album debut on No. 3 on Billboards Top Country Album chart with 26,000 equivalent album units, mostly in traditional album sales. It sold a further 8,700 copies in the second week. It has sold 82,900 copies in the United States as of April 2019.

Track listing

Personnel
Buddy Cannon – production
Alison Krauss – background vocals, fiddle
Willie Nelson – vocals, guitar
Mickey Raphael – harmonica
James Mitchell – guitar
Bobby Terry – electric guitar, steel guitar, acoustic guitar

Charts

Weekly charts

Year-end charts

Release history

References

2018 albums
Willie Nelson albums
Legacy Recordings albums
Albums produced by Buddy Cannon